Nils Köpp is a German former figure skater who represented East Germany. He is the 1983 World Junior bronze medalist. After moving up to the senior level, he won bronze at the 1985 Golden Spin of Zagreb, silver at the 1986 Karl Schäfer Memorial, and five medals at the East German Championships (four silver and one bronze).

Köpp competed at two European Championships, placing 12th in 1985 and 13th in 1986. He belonged to SC Karl-Marx-Stadt (Chemnitz).

Competitive highlights

References 

20th-century births
German male single skaters
Living people
Sportspeople from Chemnitz
World Junior Figure Skating Championships medalists
Year of birth missing (living people)